The 200 Miles of Buenos Aires was a non-championship race sports car event held in Autódromo Oscar Alfredo Gálvez, Buenos Aires, Argentina.
The race was held on January 18, 1970, after the 1000 km Buenos Aires race (11 January).

The race, which did not grant championship points, was won by Andrea De Adamich and Piers Courage driving an Alfa Romeo 33. 2nd and 3rd were a Porsche 908/02 and the works Matra MS630/650.

Official results
Class winners in bold.  Cars failing to complete 70% of the winner's distance marked as Not Classified (NC).

References
Race report

200 Miles Of Buenos Aires Results, 1970
Motorsport in Argentina
1970 in motorsport
Sports car races
M